The Joseph J. Gentile Arena, formerly known as the Joseph J. Gentile Center or "The Joe", is a 4,486-seat multi-purpose arena on the campus of Loyola University in Chicago, Illinois. The arena opened in 1996. It is the home of the Loyola Ramblers men's and women's basketball programs. Renovations at the facility began in the summer of 2011.

On March 3, 2011, the $26 million Norville Center for Intercollegiate Athletics opened adjacent to the Gentile Arena. The Norville Center houses the university's athletic training facilities, locker rooms, as well as the offices of the athletic department that were formerly housed in Alumni Gym.

The Gentile Center was the site of the 1999 Midwestern Collegiate Conference NCAA women's volleyball tournament.

The Gentile Center was also the site of the 2014 NCAA Men's Collegiate Volleyball Championships on May 1 and May 3, 2014.

Joe Gentile was a Chicago area car dealer who donated money to the university for the arena.

See also
 List of NCAA Division I basketball arenas

References

External links
Gentile Arena Profile at LoyolaRamblers.com

College basketball venues in the United States
Basketball venues in Chicago
Loyola Ramblers basketball
1996 establishments in Illinois
Sports venues completed in 1996
College volleyball venues in the United States
Volleyball venues in Chicago